Sorbian may refer to:

 Sorbs, a Slavic people in modern-day Germany
 Sorbian languages, a group of closely related West Slavic languages
 Upper Sorbian language
 Lower Sorbian language

See also
 Serbin, Texas, founded by 19th Century Wendish immigrants, name is derived from the same root

Language and nationality disambiguation pages